Dr. Gergely Tapolczai (born December 21, 1975) is a Hungarian politician, member of the National Assembly (MP) from the National List of Fidesz since 2010. The deaf politician is the first user of Sign language in the Hungarian parliament. He was elected to the  European Union of the Deaf (EUD) as a board member in 2009, and served as the vice-president of the EUD until resigning on February 5, 2021.

He was a member of the Committee for Youth, Social, Family, and Housing Affairs from May 14, 2010, to May 5, 2014, and Committee on Sport and Tourism from February 14, 2011, to May 5, 2014. He became Chairman of the Subcommittee for People with Disabilities on June 28, 2010. He is also a member of the Welfare Committee since 2014 and Legislative Committee since 2015.

He supports and promotes the United Nations Convention on Rights of People with Disabilities (UNCRPD) to EU member states and talks about the Hungarian Sign Language Act.

References

1975 births
Living people
Hungarian jurists
Fidesz politicians
Members of the National Assembly of Hungary (2010–2014)
Members of the National Assembly of Hungary (2014–2018)
Members of the National Assembly of Hungary (2018–2022)
Members of the National Assembly of Hungary (2022–2026)
Deaf politicians
Hungarian deaf people